This is a list of the mammal species recorded in Panama. Among the mammals in Panama, two are critically endangered, seven are endangered, eleven are vulnerable and three are near threatened. One species is classified as extinct.

The following tags are used to highlight each species' conservation status as assessed by the International Union for Conservation of Nature:

Some species were assessed using an earlier set of criteria. Species assessed using this system have the following instead of near threatened and least concern categories:

Subclass: Theria

Infraclass: Metatheria

Order: Didelphimorphia (common opossums)

Didelphimorphia is the order of common opossums of the Western Hemisphere. Opossums probably diverged from the basic South American marsupials in the late Cretaceous or early Paleocene. They are small to medium-sized marsupials, about the size of a large house cat, with a long snout and prehensile tail.

Family: Didelphidae (American opossums)
Subfamily: Caluromyinae
Genus: Caluromys
 Derby's woolly opossum, C. derbianus LC
Subfamily: Didelphinae
Genus: Chironectes
 Water opossum, Chironectes minimus LR/nt
Genus: Didelphis
 Common opossum, Didelphis marsupialis LR/lc
Genus: Marmosa
 Alston's mouse opossum, Marmosa alstoni LR/nt
 Isthmian mouse opossum, Marmosa isthmica
 Mexican mouse opossum, Marmosa mexicana LR/lc
 Robinson's mouse opossum, Marmosa robinsoni LR/lc
Genus: Marmosops
 Panama slender opossum, Marmosops invictus LR/nt
Genus: Metachirus
 Brown four-eyed opossum, Metachirus nudicaudatus LR/lc
Genus: Monodelphis
 Sepia short-tailed opossum, Monodelphis adusta LR/lc
Genus: Philander
 Gray four-eyed opossum, Philander opossum LR/lc

Infraclass: Eutheria

Order: Sirenia (manatees and dugongs)

Sirenia is an order of fully aquatic, herbivorous mammals that inhabit rivers, estuaries, coastal marine waters, swamps, and marine wetlands. All four species are endangered.

Family: Trichechidae
Genus: Trichechus
 West Indian manatee, T. manatus

Order: Cingulata (armadillos) 

Armadillos are small mammals with a bony armored shell. Two of twenty-one extant species are present in Panama; the remainder are only found in South America, where they originated. Their much larger relatives, the pampatheres and glyptodonts, once lived in North and South America but went extinct following the appearance of humans.

Family: Dasypodidae (long-nosed armadillos)
Subfamily: Dasypodinae
Genus: Dasypus
 Nine-banded armadillo, D. novemcinctus 
Family: Chlamyphoridae (armadillos)
Subfamily: Tolypeutinae
Genus: Cabassous
 Northern naked-tailed armadillo, C. centralis

Order: Pilosa (anteaters, sloths and tamanduas)

The order Pilosa is extant only in the Americas and includes the anteaters, sloths, and tamanduas.

Suborder: Folivora
Family: Bradypodidae (three-toed sloths)
Genus: Bradypus
 Pygmy three-toed sloth, B. pygmaeus 
 Brown-throated three-toed sloth, B. variegatus 
Family: Choloepodidae (two-toed sloths)
Genus: Choloepus
 Hoffmann's two-toed sloth, C. hoffmanni 
Suborder: Vermilingua
Family: Cyclopedidae
Genus: Cyclopes
 Silky anteater, C. didactylus 
Central American silky anteater, C. dorsalis 
Family: Myrmecophagidae (American anteaters)
Genus: Myrmecophaga
 Giant anteater, M. tridactyla 
Genus: Tamandua
 Northern tamandua, T. mexicana

Order: Primates

The order Primates contains humans and their closest relatives: lemurs, lorisoids, tarsiers, monkeys, and apes. All the non-human Panamanian primates are New World monkeys.

Suborder: Haplorhini
Infraorder: Simiiformes
Parvorder: Platyrrhini (New World monkeys)
Family: Aotidae
Genus: Aotus
 Panamanian night monkey, Aotus zonalis DD – may be a subspecies of gray-bellied night monkey, Aotus lemurinus VU
Family: Cebidae
Subfamily: Callitrichinae
Genus: Saguinus
 Geoffroy's tamarin, Saguinus geoffroyi LC
Subfamily: Cebinae
Genus: Cebus
 Colombian white-faced capuchin, Cebus capucinus LC
 Panamanian white-faced capuchin, Cebus imitator LC
Genus: Saimiri
 Central American squirrel monkey, Saimiri oerstedii VU
Family: Atelidae
Subfamily: Alouattinae
Genus: Alouatta
 Mantled howler, Alouatta palliata LC
 Coiba Island howler, Alouatta coibensis EN
Subfamily: Atelinae
Genus: Ateles
 Black-headed spider monkey (Ateles fusciceps) CR
 Geoffroy's spider monkey, Ateles geoffroyi EN

Order: Rodentia (rodents)

Rodents make up the largest order of mammals, with over 40% of mammalian species. They have two incisors in the upper and lower jaw which grow continually and must be kept short by gnawing.

Suborder: Hystricognathi
Family: Erethizontidae (New World porcupines)
Subfamily: Erethizontinae
Genus: Coendou
 Mexican hairy dwarf porcupine, Coendou mexicanus LR/lc
 Rothschild's porcupine, Coendou rothschildi LR/lc
 Andean porcupine, Coendou quichua LR/dd
Family: Caviidae (guinea pigs)
Subfamily: Hydrochoerinae (capybaras and rock cavies)
Genus: Hydrochoerus
 Lesser capybara, Hydrochoerus isthmius LR/dd
Family: Dasyproctidae (agoutis and pacas)
Genus: Dasyprocta
 Coiban agouti, Dasyprocta coibae EN
 Central American agouti, Dasyprocta punctata LR/lc
Family: Cuniculidae
Genus: Cuniculus
 Lowland paca, Cuniculus paca LC
Family: Echimyidae
Subfamily: Echimyinae
Genus: Diplomys
 Rufous soft-furred spiny-rat, Diplomys labilis LR/lc
Subfamily: Eumysopinae
Genus: Hoplomys
 Armored rat, Hoplomys gymnurus LR/lc
Genus: Proechimys
 Tome's spiny-rat, Proechimys semispinosus LR/lc
Suborder: Sciurognathi
Family: Sciuridae (squirrels)
Subfamily: Sciurinae
Tribe: Sciurini
Genus: Microsciurus
 Central American dwarf squirrel, Microsciurus alfari LR/lc
 Western dwarf squirrel, Microsciurus mimulus LR/lc
Genus: Sciurus
 Red-tailed squirrel, Sciurus granatensis LR/lc
 Variegated squirrel, Sciurus variegatoides LR/lc
Genus: Syntheosciurus
 Bangs's mountain squirrel, Syntheosciurus brochus LR/nt
Family: Geomyidae
Genus: Orthogeomys
 Chiriqui pocket gopher, Orthogeomys cavator LR/lc
 Darien pocket gopher, Orthogeomys dariensis LR/lc
Family: Heteromyidae
Subfamily: Heteromyinae
Genus: Heteromys
 Panamanian spiny pocket mouse, Heteromys adspersus LR/nt
 Southern spiny pocket mouse, Heteromys australis LR/lc
 Desmarest's spiny pocket mouse, Heteromys desmarestianus LR/lc
Family: Cricetidae
Subfamily: Tylomyinae
Genus: Nyctomys
 Sumichrast's vesper rat, Nyctomys sumichrasti LR/lc
Genus: Tylomys
 Fulvous-bellied climbing rat, Tylomys fulviventer LR/nt
 Panamanian climbing rat, Tylomys panamensis VU
 Watson's climbing rat, Tylomys watsoni LR/lc
Subfamily: Neotominae
Genus: Isthmomys
 Yellow isthmus rat, Isthmomys flavidus LR/lc
 Mount Pirri isthmus rat, Isthmomys pirrensis LR/nt
Genus: Peromyscus
 Mexican deer mouse, Peromyscus mexicanus LR/lc
Genus: Reithrodontomys
 Chiriqui harvest mouse, Reithrodontomys creper LR/lc
 Darien harvest mouse, Reithrodontomys darienensis LR/lc
 Mexican harvest mouse, Reithrodontomys mexicanus LR/lc
 Sumichrast's harvest mouse, Reithrodontomys sumichrasti LR/lc
Genus: Scotinomys
 Alston's brown mouse, Scotinomys teguina LR/lc
 Chiriqui brown mouse, Scotinomys xerampelinus LR/lc
Subfamily: Sigmodontinae
Genus: Ichthyomys
 Tweedy's crab-eating rat, Ichthyomys tweedii LR/lc
Genus: Melanomys
 Dusky rice rat, Melanomys caliginosus LR/lc
Genus: Neacomys
 Painted bristly mouse, Neacomys pictus LR/nt
Genus: Oecomys
 Bicolored arboreal rice rat, Oecomys bicolor LR/lc
 Trinidad arboreal rice rat, Oecomys trinitatis LR/lc
Genus: Oligoryzomys
 Fulvous pygmy rice rat, Oligoryzomys fulvescens LR/lc
 Sprightly pygmy rice rat, Oligoryzomys vegetus LR/nt
Genus: Oryzomys
 Tomes's rice rat, Oryzomys albigularis LR/lc
 Alfaro's rice rat, Oryzomys alfaroi LR/lc
 Bolivar rice rat, Oryzomys bolivaris LR/lc
 Coues' rice rat, Oryzomys couesi LR/lc
 Boquete rice rat, Oryzomys devius LR/lc
 Talamancan rice rat, Oryzomys talamancae LR/lc
Genus: Rheomys
 Goldman's water mouse, Rheomys raptor LR/lc
 Underwood's water mouse, Rheomys underwoodi LR/lc
Genus: Rhipidomys
 Broad-footed climbing mouse, Rhipidomys scandens VU
Genus: Sigmodon
 Southern cotton rat, Sigmodon hirsutus LC
Genus: Sigmodontomys
 Alfaro's rice water rat, Sigmodontomys alfari LR/lc
Genus: Zygodontomys
 Short-tailed cane rat, Zygodontomys brevicauda LR/lc

Order: Lagomorpha (lagomorphs)

The lagomorphs comprise two families, Leporidae (hares and rabbits), and Ochotonidae (pikas). Though they can resemble rodents, and were classified as a superfamily in that order until the early 20th century, they have since been considered a separate order. They differ from rodents in a number of physical characteristics, such as having four incisors in the upper jaw rather than two.

Family: Leporidae (rabbits, hares)
Genus: Sylvilagus
 Dice's cottontail, Sylvilagus dicei VU
 Eastern cottontail, Sylvilagus floridanus LR/lc
Central American tapetí, Sylvilagus gabbi LC
Northern tapetí, Sylvilagus incitatus NE

Order: Eulipotyphla (shrews, hedgehogs, moles, and solenodons)

Eulipotyphlans are insectivorous mammals. Shrews and solenodons closely resemble mice, hedgehogs carry spines, while moles are stout-bodied burrowers.

Family: Soricidae (shrews)
Subfamily: Soricinae
Tribe: Blarinini
Genus: Cryptotis
 Enders's small-eared shrew, Cryptotis endersi EN
 Talamancan small-eared shrew, Cryptotis gracilis VU
 Blackish small-eared shrew, Cryptotis nigrescens LR/lc
 North American least shrew, Cryptotis parva LR/lc

Order: Chiroptera (bats)

The bats' most distinguishing feature is that their forelimbs are developed as wings, making them the only mammals capable of flight. Bat species account for about 20% of all mammals.

Family: Noctilionidae
Genus: Noctilio
 Lesser bulldog bat, Noctilio albiventris LR/lc
 Greater bulldog bat, Noctilio leporinus LR/lc
Family: Vespertilionidae
Subfamily: Myotinae
Genus: Myotis
 Silver-tipped myotis, Myotis albescens LR/lc
 Hairy-legged myotis, Myotis keaysi LR/lc
 Black myotis, Myotis nigricans LR/lc
 Montane myotis, Myotis oxyotus LR/lc
 Riparian myotis, Myotis riparius LR/lc
Subfamily: Vespertilioninae
Genus: Eptesicus
 Brazilian brown bat, Eptesicus brasiliensis LR/lc
 Argentine brown bat, Eptesicus furinalis LR/lc
 Big brown bat, Eptesicus fuscus LR/lc
Genus: Lasiurus
 Desert red bat, Lasiurus blossevillii LR/lc
 Tacarcuna bat, Lasiurus castaneus VU
 Southern yellow bat, Lasiurus ega LR/lc
 Big red bat, Lasiurus egregius LR/nt
Family: Molossidae
Genus: Cynomops
 Southern dog-faced bat, Cynomops planirostris LR/lc
Genus: Eumops
 Black bonneted bat, Eumops auripendulus LR/lc
 Dwarf bonneted bat, Eumops bonariensis LR/lc
 Wagner's bonneted bat, Eumops glaucinus LR/lc
 Sanborn's bonneted bat, Eumops hansae LR/lc
Genus: Molossus
 Black mastiff bat, Molossus ater LR/lc
 Bonda mastiff bat, Molossus bondae LR/lc
 Coiban mastiff bat, Molossus coibensis LR/nt
 Velvety free-tailed bat, Molossus molossus LR/lc
 Sinaloan mastiff bat, Molossus sinaloae LR/lc
Genus: Nyctinomops
 Broad-eared bat, Nyctinomops laticaudatus LR/lc
Genus: Promops
 Big crested mastiff bat, Promops centralis LR/lc
Genus: Tadarida
 Mexican free-tailed bat, Tadarida brasiliensis LR/nt
Family: Emballonuridae
Genus: Cormura
 Wagner's sac-winged bat, Cormura brevirostris LR/lc
Genus: Diclidurus
 Northern ghost bat, Diclidurus albus LR/lc
Genus: Peropteryx
 Lesser doglike bat, Peropteryx macrotis LR/lc
Genus: Rhynchonycteris
 Proboscis bat, Rhynchonycteris naso LR/lc
Genus: Saccopteryx
 Greater sac-winged bat, Saccopteryx bilineata LR/lc
 Lesser sac-winged bat, Saccopteryx leptura LR/lc
Family: Mormoopidae
Genus: Pteronotus
 Big naked-backed bat, Pteronotus gymnonotus LR/lc
 Parnell's mustached bat, Pteronotus parnellii LR/lc
 Wagner's mustached bat, Pteronotus personatus LR/lc
Family: Phyllostomidae
Subfamily: Phyllostominae
Genus: Chrotopterus
 Big-eared woolly bat, Chrotopterus auritus LR/lc
Genus: Glyphonycteris
 Davies's big-eared bat, Glyphonycteris daviesi LR/nt
 Tricolored big-eared bat, Glyphonycteris sylvestris LR/nt
Genus: Lampronycteris
 Yellow-throated big-eared bat, Lampronycteris brachyotis LR/lc
Genus: Lonchorhina
 Tomes's sword-nosed bat, Lonchorhina aurita LR/lc
Genus: Lophostoma
 Pygmy round-eared bat, Lophostoma brasiliense LR/lc
 White-throated round-eared bat, Lophostoma silvicolum LR/lc
Genus: Macrophyllum
 Long-legged bat, Macrophyllum macrophyllum LR/lc
Genus: Micronycteris
 Hairy big-eared bat, Micronycteris hirsuta LR/lc
 White-bellied big-eared bat, Micronycteris minuta LR/lc
 Schmidts's big-eared bat, Micronycteris schmidtorum LR/lc
Genus: Mimon
 Striped hairy-nosed bat, Mimon crenulatum LR/lc
Genus: Phylloderma
 Pale-faced bat, Phylloderma stenops LR/lc
Genus: Phyllostomus
 Pale spear-nosed bat, Phyllostomus discolor LR/lc
 Greater spear-nosed bat, Phyllostomus hastatus LR/lc
Genus: Tonatia
 Stripe-headed round-eared bat, Tonatia saurophila LR/lc
Genus: Trachops
 Fringe-lipped bat, Trachops cirrhosus LR/lc
Genus: Trinycteris
 Niceforo's big-eared bat, Trinycteris nicefori LR/lc
Subfamily: Lonchophyllinae
Genus: Lionycteris
 Chestnut long-tongued bat, Lionycteris spurrelli LR/lc
Genus: Lonchophylla
 Godman's nectar bat, Lonchophylla mordax LR/lc
 Orange nectar bat, Lonchophylla robusta LR/lc
 Thomas's nectar bat, Lonchophylla thomasi LR/lc
Subfamily: Glossophaginae
Genus: Anoura
 Handley's tailless bat, Anoura cultrata LR/lc
 Geoffroy's tailless bat, Anoura geoffroyi LR/lc
Genus: Glossophaga
 Commissaris's long-tongued bat, Glossophaga commissarisi LR/lc
 Pallas's long-tongued bat, Glossophaga soricina LR/lc
Genus: Hylonycteris
 Underwood's long-tongued bat, Hylonycteris underwoodi LR/nt
Genus: Lichonycteris
 Dark long-tongued bat, Lichonycteris obscura LR/lc
Subfamily: Carolliinae
Genus: Carollia
 Silky short-tailed bat, Carollia brevicauda LR/lc
 Chestnut short-tailed bat, Carollia castanea LR/lc
 Seba's short-tailed bat, Carollia perspicillata LR/lc
Subfamily: Stenodermatinae
Genus: Ametrida
 Little white-shouldered bat, Ametrida centurio LR/lc
Genus: Artibeus
 Aztec fruit-eating bat, Artibeus aztecus LR/lc
 Great fruit-eating bat, Artibeus intermedius LR/lc
 Jamaican fruit bat, Artibeus jamaicensis LR/lc
 Great fruit-eating bat, Artibeus lituratus LR/lc
 Pygmy fruit-eating bat, Artibeus phaeotis LR/lc
 Toltec fruit-eating bat, Artibeus toltecus LR/lc
Genus: Centurio
 Wrinkle-faced bat, Centurio senex LR/lc
Genus: Chiroderma
 Salvin's big-eyed bat, Chiroderma salvini LR/lc
 Little big-eyed bat, Chiroderma trinitatum LR/lc
 Hairy big-eyed bat, Chiroderma villosum LR/lc
Genus: Ectophylla
 Honduran white bat, Ectophylla alba LR/nt
Genus: Enchisthenes
 Velvety fruit-eating bat, Enchisthenes hartii LR/lc
Genus: Mesophylla
 MacConnell's bat, Mesophylla macconnelli LR/lc
Genus: Sturnira
 Little yellow-shouldered bat, Sturnira lilium LR/lc
 Highland yellow-shouldered bat, Sturnira ludovici LR/lc
 Louis's yellow-shouldered bat, Sturnira luisi LR/lc
 Talamancan yellow-shouldered bat, Sturnira mordax LR/nt
Genus: Uroderma
 Tent-making bat, Uroderma bilobatum LR/lc
 Brown tent-making bat, Uroderma magnirostrum LR/lc
Genus: Vampyressa
 Striped yellow-eared bat, Vampyressa nymphaea LR/lc
 Southern little yellow-eared bat, Vampyressa pusilla LR/lc
Genus: Vampyrodes
 Great stripe-faced bat, Vampyrodes caraccioli LR/lc
Genus: Platyrrhinus
 Thomas's broad-nosed bat, Platyrrhinus dorsalis LR/lc
 Heller's broad-nosed bat, Platyrrhinus helleri LR/lc
 Shadowy broad-nosed bat, Platyrrhinus umbratus LR/nt
 Greater broad-nosed bat, Platyrrhinus vittatus LR/lc
Subfamily: Desmodontinae
Genus: Desmodus
 Common vampire bat, Desmodus rotundus LR/lc
Genus: Diaemus
 White-winged vampire bat, Diaemus youngi LR/lc
Genus: Diphylla
 Hairy-legged vampire bat, Diphylla ecaudata LR/nt
Family: Furipteridae
Genus: Furipterus
 Thumbless bat, Furipterus horrens LR/lc
Family: Thyropteridae
Genus: Thyroptera
 Peters's disk-winged bat, Thyroptera discifera LR/lc
 Spix's disk-winged bat, Thyroptera tricolor LR/lc

Order: Cetacea (whales)

The order Cetacea includes whales, dolphins and porpoises. They are the mammals most fully adapted to aquatic life with a spindle-shaped nearly hairless body, protected by a thick layer of blubber, and forelimbs and tail modified to provide propulsion underwater.

Suborder: Mysticeti
Family: Balaenopteridae (baleen whales)
Genus: Balaenoptera 
 Common minke whale, Balaenoptera acutorostrata
 Sei whale, Balaenoptera borealis
 Bryde's whale, Balaenoptera brydei
 Blue whale, Balaenoptera musculus
Genus: Megaptera
 Humpback whale, Megaptera novaeangliae
Suborder: Odontoceti
Superfamily: Platanistoidea
Family: Delphinidae (marine dolphins)
Genus: Delphinus
 Short-beaked common dolphin, Delphinus delphis DD
Genus: Feresa
 Pygmy killer whale, Feresa attenuata DD
Genus: Globicephala
 Short-finned pilot whale, Globicephala macrorhyncus DD
Genus: Lagenodelphis
 Fraser's dolphin, Lagenodelphis hosei DD
Genus: Grampus
 Risso's dolphin, Grampus griseus DD
Genus: Orcinus
 Killer whale, Orcinus orca DD
Genus: Peponocephala
 Melon-headed whale, Peponocephala electra DD
Genus: Pseudorca
 False killer whale, Pseudorca crassidens DD
Genus: Sotalia
 Guiana dolphin, Sotalia guianensis DD
Genus: Stenella
 Pantropical spotted dolphin, Stenella attenuata DD
 Clymene dolphin, Stenella clymene DD
 Striped dolphin, Stenella coeruleoalba DD
 Atlantic spotted dolphin, Stenella frontalis DD
 Spinner dolphin, Stenella longirostris DD
Genus: Steno
 Rough-toothed dolphin, Steno bredanensis DD
Genus: Tursiops
 Common bottlenose dolphin, Tursiops truncatus
Family: Physeteridae (sperm whales)
Genus: Physeter
 Sperm whale, Physeter catodon DD
Family: Kogiidae (dwarf sperm whales)
Genus: Kogia
 Pygmy sperm whale, Kogia breviceps DD
 Dwarf sperm whale, Kogia sima DD
Superfamily Ziphioidea
Family: Ziphidae (beaked whales)
Genus: Mesoplodon
 Gervais' beaked whale, Mesoplodon europaeus DD
 Ginkgo-toothed beaked whale, Mesoplodon ginkgodens DD
 Pygmy beaked whale, Mesoplodon peruvianus DD
Genus: Ziphius
 Cuvier's beaked whale, Ziphius cavirostris DD

Order: Carnivora (carnivorans)

There are over 260 species of carnivores, the majority of which eat meat as their primary dietary item. They have a characteristic skull shape and dentition.

Suborder: Feliformia
Family: Felidae (cats)
Subfamily: Felinae
Genus: Herpailurus
 Jaguarundi, Herpailurus yagouaroundi LC
Genus: Leopardus
 Ocelot, Leopardus pardalis LC
 Oncilla, Leopardus tigrinus NT
 Margay, Leopardus wiedii LC
Genus: Puma
 Cougar, Puma concolor LC
Subfamily: Pantherinae
Genus: Panthera
 Jaguar, Panthera onca NT
Suborder: Caniformia
Family: Canidae (dogs, foxes)
Genus: Canis
 Coyote, Canis latrans LC
Genus: Cerdocyon
 Crab-eating fox, Cerdocyon thous LC
Genus: Speothos
 Bush dog, Speothos venaticus VU
Genus: Urocyon
 Gray fox, Urocyon cinereoargenteus LC
Family: Procyonidae (raccoons)
Genus: Bassaricyon
 Northern olingo, Bassaricyon gabbii LR/nt
 Western lowland olingo, Bassaricyon medius LR/lc
Genus: Bassariscus
 Cacomistle, Bassariscus sumichrasti LR/nt
Genus: Nasua
 White-nosed coati, Nasua narica LR/lc
Genus: Potos
 Kinkajou, Potos flavus LR/lc
Genus: Procyon
 Crab-eating raccoon, Procyon cancrivorus LR/lc
 Common raccoon, Procyon lotor LR/lc
Family: Mustelidae (mustelids)
Genus: Eira
 Tayra, Eira barbara LR/lc
Genus: Galictis
 Greater grison, Galictis vittata LR/lc
Genus: Lontra
 Neotropical river otter, Lontra longicaudis NT
Genus: Neogale
 Long-tailed weasel, Neogale frenata LR/lc
Family: Mephitidae
Genus: Conepatus
 Striped hog-nosed skunk, Conepatus semistriatus LR/lc
Suborder: Pinnipedia 
Family: Phocidae (earless seals)
Genus: Neomonachus
 Caribbean monk seal, Neomonachus tropicalis EX

Order: Perissodactyla (odd-toed ungulates)

The odd-toed ungulates are browsing and grazing mammals. They are usually large to very large, and have relatively simple stomachs and a large middle toe.

Family: Tapiridae (tapirs)
Genus: Tapirus
 Baird's tapir, Tapirus bairdii EN

Order: Artiodactyla (even-toed ungulates)

The even-toed ungulates are ungulates whose weight is borne about equally by the third and fourth toes, rather than mostly or entirely by the third as in perissodactyls. There are about 220 artiodactyl species, including many that are of great economic importance to humans.

Family: Tayassuidae (peccaries)
Genus: Dicotyles
 Collared peccary, Dicotyles tajacu LC
Genus: Tayassu
 White-lipped peccary, Tayassu pecari VU
Family: Cervidae (deer)
Subfamily: Capreolinae
Genus: Mazama
 Central American red brocket, Mazama temama DD
Genus: Odocoileus
 White-tailed deer, Odocoileus virginianus LR/lc

See also
List of chordate orders
Lists of mammals by region
List of prehistoric mammals
Mammal classification
List of mammals described in the 2000s

Notes

References
 

Panama
Mammals

Panama